Isoaminile is an antitussive (cough suppressant) used under the trade-name Peracon.

The normal therapeutic dose is 40–80 mg of the cyclamate salt, with a maximum of five doses in a 24-hour period. In addition to its central antitussive effects, it is also an anticholinergic, exhibiting both antimuscarinic and antinicotinic actions.

References 

Dimethylamino compounds
Nitriles
Antitussives
Isopropyl compounds